Dalešice is a municipality and village in Jablonec nad Nisou District in the Liberec Region of the Czech Republic. It has about 200 inhabitants.

History

The first written mention of Dalešice is from 1538. Until 1848, the village was part of the Český Dub manor. In 1960, the municipality was merged with Maršovice. In 1991, Dalešice became a sovereign municipality again.

References

Villages in Jablonec nad Nisou District